The Barguelonne is a  long river in the Lot, Tarn-et-Garonne and Lot-et-Garonne départements, southwestern France. Its source is near Terry, a hamlet in Pern. It flows generally southwest. It is a right tributary of the Garonne into which it flows between Golfech and Lamagistère.

Its main tributary is the Barguelonnette.

Départements and communes along its course
This list is ordered from source to mouth: 
Lot: Pern, Lhospitalet, Flaugnac, Castelnau-Montratier
Tarn-et-Garonne: Sauveterre, Tréjouls, Cazes-Mondenard, Lauzerte, Saint-Amans-de-Pellagal, Durfort-Lacapelette, Montbarla, Miramont-de-Quercy, Montesquieu, Saint-Nazaire-de-Valentane, Castelsagrat, Saint-Paul-d'Espis, Saint-Clair, Saint-Vincent-Lespinasse, Goudourville, Gasques, Valence
Lot-et-Garonne: Clermont-Soubiran
Tarn-et-Garonne: Golfech, Lamagistère

References

Rivers of France
Rivers of Tarn-et-Garonne
Rivers of Lot-et-Garonne
Rivers of Lot (department)
Rivers of Nouvelle-Aquitaine
Rivers of Occitania (administrative region)